The Kujang Monument is a  obelisk located in Bogor, West Java, Indonesia. It features a Kujang on top and the Bogor city coat of arms on the centre. The Kujang is a traditional weapon of the Sundanese people. The obelisk is located at the intersection of two roads: Pajajaran and Otto Iskandardinata road, near the Bogor Botanical Garden. It was built in 4 May 1982 during the rule of mayor Achmad Sobana.

See also
Architecture of Bogor

References

Bogor
Monuments and memorials in Indonesia